The International Journal of Maritime History is a peer-reviewed academic journal that covers all aspects of maritime history. The European Science Foundation's European Reference Index for the Humanities (ERIH) ranks it as a "Class One" journal. The journal is abstracted and indexed in Scopus and Historical Abstracts.

The journal was established in 1989 and published by the International Maritime History Association. Since 2013/14 it has been published by SAGE Publications. It also publishes monographs titled Research in Maritime History.

The founding editor-in-chief was Lewis R. Fischer, who was succeeded by David Starkey in 2013.

References

External links 
 

SAGE Publishing academic journals
Maritime history journals
Publications established in 1989